The Free Destourian Party (PDL), until August 2016 known as the Destourian Movement, is a Tunisian political party founded by former members of Tunisia's pre-revolution ruling party, the Constitutional Democratic Rally. In the 2014 presidential election, the Destourian Movement presented Abderrahim Zouari, Minister of Transport from 2004 to 2011, as candidate. The party is now lead by the lawyer and MP Abir Moussi. Since early 2020, the party is leading in all opinion polls for the next Tunisian general elections, and its leader Abir Moussi is always second just after incumbent president Kais Saied.

History 

The Free Destourian Party was founded by ex-prime minister Hamed Karoui on September 23, 2013, as the "destourian movement" to unite the "destourians" (supporters of the dissolved Destourian Party which governed the country for 60 years). The party participated in the 2014 elections but it failed to gain any seat in the new parliament, and its then-presidential candidate Abderrahim Zouari dropped off the elections and support the candidate Beji Caid Essebsi who eventually won the presidency.

In 2016 the PDL hold its founding congress, and in it, a new leadership rose among them Abir Moussi as president and Hatem Laamari as secretary-general. Right after the congress, the party changed its name to its current and adopted a new logo similar to that one of historical destourian part.

The unity of the new leadership was brought to test very soon, as the party in October 2016 dismissed Laamari from his position, just two months after his appointment in it before being outright fired from it for "management infractions" After that many other leaders of the party were fired from it, and in 2021 they tried to regain their old positions in the party and accused Abir Moussi of authoritarianism inside the party but failed to do any.

In August 2021, the Free Destourian Party held its first electoral convention, in which party grassroots reconfirmed Abir Moussi as president of the party for a second term of 5 years, and also elected a political bureau of 16 members. The authorities refused to allow the party to hold its convention in-person due to the COVID-19 lockdown that the country was living in back then, which forced the party to hold in online, and that made it the first Tunisian party to hold its convention. The party accused the government of using the pandemic as an excuse to crackdown on the opposition and limit its rights and freedoms.

Political Profile 
There has been a discussion between political science scholars about the classification of the PDL with some saying that it's a center-right political party while others label it as a hard-right one. The party has disputed these labels and is describing itself as a centrist political party that has its foundations in the legacy of the founder of the Tunisian republic Habib Bourguiba also known as Bourguibism which are mainly strict secularism, cultural modernity, a welfare state, Tunisian nationalism (as opposed to Pan-Arabism) which consider Tunisia as closer to the West than to the East. The party can be considered as more liberal on cultural issues and moderate capitalist in the economic field. The party is often described as staunchly opposed to Islamist movements in Tunisia. It has often called for banning the mix between religion and politics and has demanded the designation of the Muslim Brotherhood and all its affiliates in Tunisia, among them the Ennahda party as terrorist organizations.

Political Regime 
Since 2018, the PDL has called for reforming the political regime in Tunisia and declaring the Third Republic. The party has called for changing the political system from a parliamentary one as enacted by the 2014 constitution to a more presidential system similar to the 1959 constitution regime but with more democratic guarantees and less attributed powers to the president. In fact, the party has proposed its own constitution and has vowed to put it on referendum once it reaches power, in this proposed constitution, the president of the republic would have larger powers than they have now, as they would appoint the prime minister and members of their government, and ultimately dismiss them, without need for parliamentary approval. The parliament would have control powers over the executive and would be able to withdraw confidence from the prime minister.

Structure

President

Political Committee 
Since the 2021 Congress of the party, the political committee (formally known as the Political Diwan) is composed as follows: 
 Thameur Saad
 Awatef Grich
 Mohamed Karim Krifa
 Samira Saihi
 Ali Bejaoui
 Olfa Ayachi
 Neji Jarrahi
 Mohamed Ezzeddine Abdelkafi
 Hajer Enneifer
 Samira Hadded
 Nadia Ben Romdhane
 Mohamed Ammar
 Houda Selmaoui
 Mokhtar Bartagi
 Mariem Sassi

Election results

References

2013 establishments in Tunisia
Destourian parties
Nationalist parties
Political parties established in 2013
Political parties in Tunisia